Greve Strands Badmintonklub (Greve Strands BK or GSB) is a badminton club in Greve Strand outside Copenhagen, Denmark. It has won the Danish Badminton League four times and Europe Cup once.

History
The club was founded on 11 October 1937.

Notable players
 Dorte Kjær
 Flemming Delfs
 Carsten Mogensen
 Lars Paaske

Achievements

Europe Cup
Champion: 2004

Danish Badminton League
Champion: 2007–08, 2009–10, 2010–2011, 2014-15

References

External links
 Official website

Badminton clubs in Copenhagen
Copenhagen metropolitan area
Sports clubs established in 1937
1937 establishments in Denmark